This is the discography of musician Curtis Mayfield.

Albums

Albums with the Impressions

Solo albums

Compilations
 The Anthology: 1961–1977 (1992)
 A Man Like Curtis – The Best of Curtis Mayfield (1992)
 People Get Ready: The Curtis Mayfield Story (1996)
 Get Down to the Funky Groove (1996) [Charly]
 The Very Best of Curtis Mayfield (1997) R&B #91
 Give It Up – The Very Best of the Curtom Years 1970–1977 (1997)
 Beautiful Brother. The Essential Curtis Mayfield (2000)
 Soul Legacy (2001)
 Greatest Hits (2006)

Singles and charted songs

Chart hits by Mayfield

Chart hits by other artists written by Mayfield
Mayfield was a prolific composer. In addition to writing or co-writing almost all of the hit singles he had as a member of The Impressions and as a solo artist, Mayfield also wrote (and sometimes produced) numerous hits for other artists. The following is a list of chart hits, arranged chronologically, that were written (or co-written) by Curtis Mayfield and performed by artists other than Mayfield and/or The Impressions:

* Billboard magazine did not publish an R&B chart during 1964; these chart positions are from Cashbox magazine.
** This hit charted four years later in the UK.

References

External links

Discographies of American artists
Rhythm and blues discographies
Soul music discographies